The 1992–93 NCAA Division II men's ice hockey season began in November 1992 and concluded on March 20 of the following year. This was the 21st season of second-tier college ice hockey.

The NCAA restarted the Division II championship in 1993 when several Division II schools expressed interest in rekindling the second-tier championship. At the time no conferences moved to D-II and while several teams left their conferences to become Division II Independents, many more nominally D-II programs remained in their D-III conferences but would submit bids to the Division II Championship. Due to the low number of programs qualifying as Division II, the entire tournament was held between two teams as a best-of-three series.

Regular season

Standings

Note: the records of teams who were members of Division III conferences during the season can be found here.

1993 NCAA Tournament

Note: * denotes overtime period(s)

See also
 1992–93 NCAA Division I men's ice hockey season
 1992–93 NCAA Division III men's ice hockey season

References

External links

 
NCAA